Koala Lumpur: Journey To The Edge is software company Broderbund's first comedy adventure video game released for the PC in 1997. The name of the lead character is a pun on Kuala Lumpur, the capital of Malaysia.

Plot
The game centres around a Zen Master koala named Koala Lumpur (Phil Robinson) and his friend, a dingo named Dr. Dingo Tu-Far (John Stevenson) in their quest to prevent the apocalypse caused by Koala Lumpur's mistaken utterance of a mystic incantation. To perform this feat, Koala and Dr. Dingo must collect pieces of the lost scroll of cartoon prophesies spread out over four stages: Search for Dr. Dingo, Land of Lost Things, Stream of Consciousness, and Eye in the Sky.

Gameplay 
Koala Lumpur stores any items picked up in his seemingly bottomless fez. The player character is a fly which at several points must be flown into Dr. Dingo's brain.

Development 
Colossal Pictures employee James Baker originally worked on Koala Lumpur as a TV pitch for LA network executives. The project was about a mystical problem solver that was a mixture between Yoda and Mandrake the Magician, who had an Indiana Jones-esque sidekick named Dr Dingo. He ultimately failed in getting it off the ground. A couple of years later, Colossal's interactive unit led by Stuart Cudlitz found the old pitch materials and thought the "goofy investigative team" would make for a good video game. While Baker knew nothing about games, he figured its creation might make networks more open to a TV show down the track. The team pitched KOALA LUMPUR: MYSTIC MARSUPIAL to Broderbund, who greenlit the project. During the game's production, Colossal Pictures filed for bankruptcy, which made it difficult and stressful to complete the project.

Critical reception 

Rebecca Anderson of GameSpot praised the game for its silly and satirical tone, noting that it demonstrates Broderbund's willingness to experiment beyond its earnest educational titles with a comedic video game. PC Power spoke highly of the game's "difficult and challenging" puzzles, and thought it had high replayability. Next Generation enjoyed the characters for their depth, charm, and "corny one-liners". While he criticized that some of the puzzles are illogical, he found most of them inventive and concluded that the charm of the characters helps the player get past the stumbles in the gameplay. The Computer Show reviewer Al Giovetti complimented the voice cast on their vocal performance including accents and funny inflections. Game Revolution praised the game's wackiness, though thought it could become stale after a while. The Tap Repeatedly review was scathing; the site ultimately gave it the lowest rating of "double cornpoop". Similarly Jenny Guenther of Just Adventure offered a rating of F-, deeming it unrecommendable.

References

External links

Broderbund advertisement
Reset review (June 1997)
Secret Service review (September 1997)
Joystick review (June 1997)
The Washington Post review

1997 video games
Broderbund games
Point-and-click adventure games
Video games developed in the United States
Windows games
Windows-only games
Fictional marsupials
Fictional koalas